Leopolis Hotel is a hotel in Lviv, Ukraine opened in 2007. By 2011, it had twice been selected in the World Travel Awards as the best hotel in Ukraine.

It was initially opened occupying just one building and featuring 43 rooms and suites. It was subsequently expanded by incorporating two neighboring buildings and increasing its room count to 72.

References

External links 
 Official website

2007 establishments in Ukraine
Hotel buildings completed in 2007
Hotels in Lviv